Dennis Bell (29 August 1948 - 14 March 1995) was an American journalist, best known for his award-winning series of the articles on famine in Ethiopia in 1984 for Newsday.

Biography
Dennis Bell was born in Muskegon, Michigan to Ezra Douglas and Natalie VanArsdale Bell. After enlisting in the United States Army in 1968, he attended the University of Michigan for his post-secondary education in 1970. The same year Bell relocated to New York, where he attended Hofstra University for free because he worked as a school custodian. In addition, he joined the summer program for minority journalists at the Institute for Journalism Education at the University of California in Berkeley. After joining Newsday’s team in 1972, he held different positions including porter clerk and pressroom reporter while finally getting foreign assignments. One of them covered the famine in Ethiopia in 1984, together with reporter Josh Friedman and photographer Ozier Muhammad. A year after, they won the Pulitzer Prize for International Reporting in 1985. Later on, Dennis Bell was transferred to Newsday's Long Island desk, where he held the position of the assistant Suffolk County editor. Bell died of congestive heart failure and pneumonia at the age of 46.

References

Books

Pulitzer Prize for International Reporting winners
20th-century American journalists
American male journalists
University of Michigan alumni
Hofstra University alumni
UC Berkeley Graduate School of Journalism alumni
Newsday people
People from Muskegon, Michigan
1948 births
1995 deaths